Wheeling station is a U.S. historic train station located at Wheeling, Ohio County, West Virginia. It was built in 1907–1908, and is a four-story, rectangular brick and limestone building in the Beaux-Arts-style.  It measures 250 feet long by 89 feet, 6 inches, deep.  It features mansard roofs, built of concrete and covered with Spanish tile painted pink.  Passenger service ceased in 1961.  The building was remodeled in 1976 to house the West Virginia Northern Community College.

It was listed on the National Register of Historic Places in 1996 as the Wheeling Baltimore and Ohio Railroad Passenger Station.

Gallery

References

See also
List of historic sites in Ohio County, West Virginia
List of Registered Historic Places in West Virginia

Railway stations on the National Register of Historic Places in West Virginia
Buildings and structures in Wheeling, West Virginia
Railway stations in the United States opened in 1908
Beaux-Arts architecture in West Virginia
Buildings and structures in Ohio County, West Virginia
Former Baltimore and Ohio Railroad stations
Museums in Ohio County, West Virginia
Railroad museums in West Virginia
Former railway stations in West Virginia
National Register of Historic Places in Wheeling, West Virginia
Individually listed contributing properties to historic districts on the National Register in West Virginia
1908 establishments in West Virginia